Selle Italia–Ghezzi was an Italian professional cycling team, which competed in elite road bicycle racing events such as the UCI Women's Road World Cup.

Major wins

2004
GP Liberazione, Olga Slyusareva
Stage 1 Tour de l'Aude Cycliste Féminin, Alison Wright
Stage 7 Giro d'Italia Femminile, Olga Slyusareva

2005
Berner Rundfahrt, Edita Pučinskaitė
Stage 4 Tour du Grand Montréal, Daniela Poli
Stage 4 Giro del Trentino Alto Adige-Südtirol, Edita Pučinskaitė
GP Carnevale d'Europa, Modesta Vžesniauskaitė
Stage 3 Internationale Thüringen Rundfahrt der Frauen, Joanne Kiesanowski
Stage 5 Internationale Thüringen Rundfahrt der Frauen, Edita Pučinskaitė
 Overall Giro di San Marino, Modesta Vžesniauskaitė
Stage 2, Modesta Vžesniauskaitė
  Overall Tour Cycliste Féminin Ardèche Sud Rhône-Alpes, Edita Pučinskaitė
Stage 1b, Edita Pučinskaitė
 Overall Vuelta Ciclista Femenina a El Salvador, Edita Pučinskaitė
Prologue, Stages 1 & 2, Edita Pučinskaitė
Stage 3, Sigrid Corneo
 
2006
Stage 3 Gracia–Orlová, Olivia Gollan
Stage 2 Tour du Grand Montréal, Olivia Gollan
  Overall Giro d'Italia Femminile, Edita Pučinskaitė
Stage 5, Marta Vilajosana Andreu
Stage 10, Edita Pučinskaitė
  Overall Tour Cycliste Féminin Ardèche Sud Rhône-Alpes
Stages 1, 2b & 5, Edita Pučinskaitė
Stage 2a, Silvia Valsecchi
Stage 1 Vuelta Ciclista Femenina a El Salvador, Olivia Gollan
Stage 3 Vuelta Ciclista Femenina a El Salvador, Emanuela Azzini
Stage 5 Vuelta Ciclista Femenina a El Salvador, Evelyn García
Grand Prix de Santa Ana, Olivia Gollan
 
2007
Stage 5 Tour de l'Aude Cycliste Féminin, Fabiana Luperini
La Coupe du Monde Cycliste Féminine de Montréal
 Overall Tour Féminin en Limousin, Sigrid Corneo
Prologue, Silvia Valsecchi
Stage 1, Sigrid Corneo
Stage 3, Olivia Gollan
Stage 1 La Route de France Féminine, Rochelle Gilmore
Stage 3 & 4a La Route de France Féminine, Dorte Lohse Rasmussen
Stages 4 & 5 Tour Cycliste Féminin International de l'Ardèche, Fabiana Luperini

2008
Berner Rundfahrt, Susanne Ljungskog
 Overall Tour de l'Aude Cycliste Féminin, Susanne Ljungskog
Stage 4, Susanne Ljungskog
 Overall Tour de PEI, Kori Kelley-Seehafer
Stages 1, 3 & 5, Rochelle Gilmore
Stage 2 (ITT), Kori Kelley-Seehafer
 Overall Giro del Trentino Alto Adige-Südtirol, Fabiana Luperini
Stage 2, Fabiana Luperini
 Overall Giro d'Italia Femminile, Fabiana Luperini
Stages 4 & 7, Fabiana Luperini
Open de Suède Vårgårda, Kori Kelley-Seehafer
GP de Plouay – Bretagne, Fabiana Luperini

2009
Stage 2 Gracia–Orlová, Fabiana Luperini
Stage 6 Internationale Thüringen Rundfahrt der Frauen, Fabiana Luperini

National champions

2005
 Japan Road Race, Miho Oki	

2006
 Japan Road Race, Miho Oki	
 Japan Time Trial, Miho Oki	 
 El Salvador Road Race, Evelyn García
 El Salvador Time Trial, Evelyn García 
 Lithuania Time Trial, Edita Pučinskaitė
 Italy Time Trial, Silvia Valsecchi
2007
 Japan Road Race, Miho Oki	
 Japan Time Trial, Miho Oki	 	
 Oceania Road Race, Rochelle Gilmore

2008
 Japan Road Race, Miho Oki	 
 Italy Road Race, Fabiana Luperini

2009
 Pan American Time Trial, Alessandra Giuseppina Grassi
 Slovenia Road Race, Sigrid Corneo

References

Cycling teams based in Italy
UCI Women's Teams
Cycling teams established in 2008